The 2013 Montreux Volley Masters was held in Montreux, Switzerland between May 28 – June 2, 2013. Eight teams participated in this tournament.

The tournament returned after being cancelled in 2012 due to the 2012 Summer Olympics. Brazil defeated Russia to win their sixth title, with Fernanda Garay being awarded Most Valuable Player.

Participating teams

Group stage

Group A

|}

|}

Group B

|}

|}

Classification round

5th–8th place

|}

5th place match

|}

Final round

Semifinals

|}

Third place match

|}

Final

|}

Final standings

Awards
 MVP: 
 Best Scorer: 
 Best Spiker: 
 Best Blocker: 
 Best Setter: 
 Best Server: 
 Best Receiver: 
 Best Libero:

References

External links
Official website

2013
Montreux Volley Masters
Montreux Volley Masters